Hylaeaicum wurdackii is a species of flowering plant in the family Bromeliaceae, endemic to northern Peru. It was first described by Lyman Bradford Smith in 1963 as Neoregelia wurdackii.

References

Bromelioideae
Flora of Peru
Plants described in 1963